George Shelton may refer to:

 George Henry Shelton (1871–1920), U.S. Army soldier 
 George M. Shelton (1877–1949), U.S. Army soldier and Medal of Honor recipient
 George Shelton (footballer, born 1894) (1894–1960), English footballer
 George Shelton (footballer, born 1899) (1899–1934), English footballer
 George P. Shelton (1820–1902), Adjutant General for the State of Connecticut
 George Shelton (actor) (1884–1971), American actor and comedian